"I Lost My Heart in Heidelberg" is a German song composed in 1925 by Fred Raymond with lyrics by Fritz Löhner-Beda and Ernst Neubach. The song was an immediate popular hit, and in 1927 Raymond included it in a musical of the same name. Two films, released in 1926 and in 1952, take their titles from the song. It remains the theme song of Heidelberg. It was recorded in Britain by the duo Bob and Alf Pearson.

The English-language lyrics used in The Student's Romance (1935) are by Harry S. Pepper.

Lyrics

References

German songs
1925 songs
Songs from musicals
Songs written by Fred Raymond
Songs about cities
Songs about Germany
Heidelberg